Lhari may refer to:

Lhari County, county in Tibet
Lhari Town, town in Tibet
Lhari stream and Lhari peak, at the border of Ladakh and Tibet